Drass, or DRASS, is an Italian manufacturing company headquartered in Livorno, whose best known for their range of midget submarine and swimmer delivery vehicle. They also have a line of hyperbaric chambers for diver decompression.

History
Drass was founded in 1927 and set the world record for deep diving immersion with an atmospheric diving suit in 1937. Drass has built vessels for both the Italian military and the export market.

After the collapse of Cos.Mo.S in the early 2000s, Drass took over many of its product lines.

Products

SRV-300

See also
CABI Cattaneo

References

Defence companies of Italy
Shipbuilding companies of Italy
Submarines